Nova Kapela–Batrina railway station is a railway station on Novska–Tovarnik railway. Located between two settlements, Nova Kapela and Batrina. Railroad continued to Staro Petrovo Selo in one, in the other direction to Oriovac and the third direction towards to Dragovci. Nova Kapela–Batrina railway station consists of 7 railway track.

See also 
 Croatian Railways
 Zagreb–Belgrade railway

References 

Railway stations in Croatia
Buildings and structures in Brod-Posavina County